Veľká Ves is a village and municipality in the Poltár District in the Banská Bystrica Region of Slovakia. The most important sightseeing is baroque-classical evangelical church from 1772. In the village are foodstuff store and a public library.

References

External links
 
 

Villages and municipalities in Poltár District